Karl Gotthelf Lessing (July 10, 1740 in Kamenz – February 17, 1812 in Breslau) was a German mint director, comedy writer and the first biographer and estate manager of his brother Gotthold Ephraim Lessing. Among other things, he was the later owner of the Vossische Zeitung, which was still called "Royal Privilegirte Berlinische Zeitung of State and learned matters" at this time.

Quote

Works 
G. E. Lessings Leben, nebst seinem noch übrigen litterarischen Nachlasse. Berlin: 1793–1795 (3 Bände).
Schauspiele von Karl Gotth. Leßing (Berlin: bey Christian Friedrich Voß 1778)
 Schauspiele von Karl Gotth. Leßing (Berlin: bey Christian Friedrich Voß und Sohn 1780)

Bibliography 
 Karl Gotthelf Lessing – Schauspiele in drei Bänden. Hrsg. von Claude Conter. Band I. Hannover: Wehrhahn Verlag, 2007. 
 Karl Gotthelf Lessing – Schauspiele in drei Bänden. Hrsg. von Claude Conter. Band II. Hannover: Wehrhahn, 2007. 
 
 Jörg Kuhn: Frau Münzdirektor M. F. Lessing, geborene Voß, und die Geschichte einer Grabplatte, in: Jahrbuch 2006 des Vereins für die Geschichte Berlins, Band LV, Berlin 2006, S. 55–64.

External links 
 
 

German male dramatists and playwrights
German civil servants
German publishers (people)
18th-century German dramatists and playwrights
1740 births
1812 deaths